Bibo and Beshir (translit. Bibo We Beshir) is an Egyptian film in which Beshir (Asser Yassin) a young Egyptian-Tanzanian man who becomes friends with Bibo (Menna Shalabi) and falls in love with her. Forced by the circumstances, he finds himself living with Bibo in the same house.

External links

Egyptian comedy-drama films
2011 films
2011 comedy-drama films